Kevin Uriel Magaña Araujo (born 2 January 1998) is a Mexican professional footballer who plays as a winger.

Club career
Magaña made his official debut under Argentine coach Matías Almeyda against Tigres UANL in the 2017 Campeon de Campeones Final on 16 July 2017.

International career
Magaña was called up for the 2017 FIFA U-20 World Cup.

Honours
Mexico U17
CONCACAF U-17 Championship: 2015

References

External links
 
 
 
 Kevin Magaña at Eurosport

1998 births
Living people
Footballers from Guadalajara, Jalisco
Mexican footballers
Mexico under-20 international footballers
Association football forwards
Atlético Morelia players
Liga MX players
C.D. Guadalajara footballers
Club Atlético Zacatepec players